The western gerbil (Gerbillus hesperinus) is distributed mainly in northern Morocco. It is listed as Endangered by the IUCN.

References

  Database entry includes a brief justification of why this species is vulnerable and the criteria used

Gerbillus
Rodents of North Africa
Endemic fauna of Morocco
Mammals described in 1936